Florin Mergea and Oliver Marach were the defending champions, but they did not participate.

Tobias Kamke and Philipp Marx won the title, defeating František Čermák and Jonathan Erlich 3–6, 6–2, [10–3] in the final.

Seeds

Draw

Draw

References

 Main Draw

Open de Rennes - Doubles
2014 Doubles